Kjell Gösta Sundvall (born 31 March 1953) is a Swedish director/producer.

Sundvall has directed a series of films about the police officer Martin Beck (played by Peter Haber).

Selected filmography
2015 - Prästen i paradiset
2015 - I nöd eller lust
2011 - Jägarna 2
2008 - Livet i Fagervik (TV series)
2008 - Ulvenatten
2007 - Beck – Gamen
2006 - Beck – Advokaten
2005 - Vinnare och förlorare
2004 - Hotet
2002 - Grabben i graven bredvid  from the book by Katarina Mazetti
2002 - Beck – Enslingen
2002 - Beck – Kartellen
2001 - Beck – Hämndens pris
1999 - Tomten är far till alla barnen
1998 - c/o Segemyhr
1998 - Sista Kontraktet (The Last Contract)
1997 - Beck – Pensionat Pärlan
1996 - Jägarna (Hunters)
1986 - I lagens namn
1983 - Lyckans ost
1981 - Inget att bråka om, Johansson (TV film)
1980 - Vi hade i alla fall tur med vädret (TV film)
1980 - Jackpot (TV film)

External links

1953 births
Living people
People from Boden Municipality
Swedish film directors
Best Director Guldbagge Award winners